Fast-roping is a technique for descending a thick rope, allowing troops to deploy from a helicopter in places where the aircraft cannot touch down. 

The person holds onto the rope with gloved hands (with or without using their feet) and slides down it.

Fast roping is quicker than abseiling (rappelling), although more dangerous, particularly if the person is carrying a heavy load, because the rope is not attached to them with a descender. The technique is particularly useful for naval infantry, who can use it to board ships at sea.

History 
The technique was first developed by the UK with British rope manufacturer Marlow Ropes, and first used in combat during the Falklands War. The original rope was made of thick nylon that could be used in a manner akin to a fireman's pole. The special ropes used today are braided (plaited), producing a pattern on the outer circumference that is not smooth and so is easier to grip. Originally, each person would hold the rope for the next person, but this has been phased out.

Equipment and techniques

Rope 
The rope must be thick, typically 40mm (1.57 in) diameter, to prevent it from being wildly jerked about from the rotor blast of the helicopter. Some types have a weighted core, the ballast helping to combat the blast effect.

Glove techniques
Fast-ropers use heat-resistant gloves to protect their hands from the heat of friction while descending. Such gloves are generally not dextrous enough to be useful after the descent has been completed, though specialized gloves have been developed for this purpose. More often, a glove-inside-glove technique is used, with tactical gloves worn inside heavy leather metalworking gloves.  After descending the rope, the wearer removes the outer gloves to regain dexterity.

Use of feet

In the U.S. Marine Corps, fast-ropers are trained to control the speed of descent by using their legs and feet in addition to their hands (instructors claim that some Marines have let go of their rope because their gloves became too hot, causing injury). Deployment of around 25 fast-ropers onto a ship can take about 30 seconds.

The British military advises against use of the feet as this can make the descent for following personnel more dangerous: boot polish or the leather of the boot can make the rope extremely slippery.

See also
 Special Patrol Insertion/Extraction

References

Assault tactics